The Volkstag (English: People's Diet) was the parliament of the Free City of Danzig between 1919 and 1939.

After World War I Danzig (Gdańsk) became a Free City under the protection of the League of Nations. The first  elections to a constitutional convention took place on 16 May 1920, and the first parliamentary session on 14 June 1920 at the former West Prussian Provincial administration building (Provinzialverwaltung – Landeshaus), Neugarten (today Nowe Ogrody). The building was demolished after World War II.

The Volkstag was elected by the male and female citizens of Danzig above 20 years of age; members of the Volkstag were required to be above 25 years of age. Further elections were held in 1923, 1927, 1930, 1933 and 1935.

History

1920 elections

1923 elections

1927 elections

1930 elections

1933 elections

After the  Polish state increased its Westerplatte garrison by 120 soldiers, the local populace's fear of a Polish invasion was used by the Nazi party to boost their election chances. Provocative marches, speeches and a broadcast of Hitler's speech resulted in an absolute majority (50.03%) of the vote in the 28 May 1933 election.

1935 elections
After the successful Saar plebiscite, where more than 90 percent of the Saar populace voted in favour of Germany, the Nazis expected to achieve a similar success in Danzig and dissolved the Volkstag on 21 February 1935. New elections were scheduled for 7 April 1935. In the following weeks the Nazi Party organized more than 1,300 rallies, the local radio station was exclusively used for their propaganda and the usage of public poster pillars was also limited to Nazi propaganda. At the same time, the opposition parties were subject to a massive terror campaign; the Social Democrats were only able to organize seven rallies, only one of which was in a major hall, and all of which were disturbed by the SA, a Nazi paramilitary force. Most other parties were unable to organize any public meetings. The Social Democrat newspaper Danziger Volksstimme and the Catholic Danziger Volkszeitung were banned twice, and the Volksstimme was furthermore confiscated in the last three days prior to the election.

However, the result of the elections (59.31% of votes for the Nazi party) was not as good as the Nazis had expected, and the planned parade of the local SA and SS units was canceled. Gauleiter Albert Forster, who started to announce the results on the radio, stopped in his speech and did not read out the results.

Action of Voidance
The opposition parties, except for the Polish Party, immediately filed a lawsuit at the Danzig High Court, where they specified 45 examples of illegal manipulation of the elections by the Nazis, including the direct threat of dismissal from public service by the Gauleiter to any official not voting for the Nazis. The secrecy of the ballot was not warranted and people who were not citizens of the Free City of Danzig had voted. The High Court examined 988 witnesses and found 40 out of 45 claims valid. However the High Court did not agree to cancel the election results, but only changed them in part: the Nazi party had to give away one seat, which was then granted to the Social Democrats.

League of Nations petition
The Social Democrats, German National and Centre parties did not accept the court verdict and protested to the League of Nations. Anthony Eden, responsible for the Danzig affairs at the League of Nations, reported the breach of the constitution on 22 January 1936. Although Spain and the Soviet Union supported immediate action, France, Turkey, Portugal and Australia preferred not to tolerate such actions in the future, while Denmark and Poland did not support any consequences. The council adjourned a decision, and after Danzig's President Arthur Greiser promised to maintain the constitution in the future, the League of Nations abandoned the petition.

Dictatorship
Following the elections the opposition was fiercely terrorized; members of the Volkstag were attacked and leaflet distributors were beaten up. A conservative member of the German National People's Party (DNVP), Curt Blavier, a former Senator and vice president of Danzig's police, was arrested. Newspapers were banned. On 10 June 1936 a meeting of the DNVP was attacked by about 100 SA and SS members, with 50 attendees requiring hospital treatment. Gustav Pietsch, an independent candidate sympathizing with the conservative DNVP, was attacked with an iron bar, pushed in front of a tram and severely injured. The DNVP "voluntarily" declared its self-dissolution.

In October 1936 120 members of the Social Democratic Party were imprisoned, and on 14 October the party was banned. On 25 May 1937 the Social Democrat politician Hans Wiechmann was killed by the Gestapo after a visit to the League of Nations' High Commissioner Carl Jacob Burckhardt.

In December 1936 leading members of the Centre Party were arrested, including several members of the Volkstag, a judge and a high public official. The Centre Party, the last opposition party, was banned in October 1937 and its Chairman, Bruno Kurowski, imprisoned.

On 21 March 1939, Greiser extended the Volkstag term for another 4 years.

Elections

Presidents of the Volkstag

1920–1921: Wilhelm Reinhard
1921-1921: Adalbert Mathaei
1921–1923: Adolf Treichel (first term)
1923–1924: Julius Gehl (first term)
1924–1926: Adolf Treichel (second term)
1926–1928: Alfred Semrau
1928–1930: Fritz Spill
1930–1931: Julius Gehl (second term)
1931–1933: Wilhelm von Wnuck (first term)
1933-1933: Franz Potrykus
1933–1936: Wilhelm von Wnuck (second term)
1937–1939: Edmund Beyl

See also

Notes

References

External links
 Pictures of the Volkstag
 Crisis No7: Danzig, Life Magazine (10 July 1939) showing a picture of a Volkstag session
 Diary of High Commissioner Sean Lester (1936)

Free City of Danzig
History of Gdańsk
Danzig Volkstag